God's Gift to Women is a 1931 American pre-Code romantic musical comedy film directed by Michael Curtiz, starring Frank Fay, Laura LaPlante, and Joan Blondell. The film, based on the play The Devil Was Sick by Jane Hinton, was originally completed as a musical film; however, because of audience dislike for musicals at that time, all the songs were cut in American prints. The full film was released intact in other countries, where there was no such decline in popularity.

Plot
Wealthy French playboy Toto Duryea (Frank Fay) is irresistible to women, but is in love with none of them. According to Monsieur Rancour (Armand Kaliz), for Toto, "every woman is like a new dish to be tasted." When he is finally and instantly smitten with American Diane Churchill (Laura LaPlante), he has great difficulty proving to her and her father (Charles Winninger) that he truly loves her. Finally, he convinces her that he is sincere; Mr. Churchill insists that Toto give up his women and carousing and stay away from his daughter for six months to prove he has reformed. He also asks that Toto get examined by Churchill's doctor.

Dr. Dumont (Arthur Edmund Carewe) has bad news for Toto: his heart is so weak, even the excitement caused by so much as a woman's kiss would be fatal. Toto takes to his bed, but three of his girlfriends insist on nursing him: Fifi (Joan Blondell), Florine (Louise Brooks) and Dagmar (Yola d'Avril). When they all converge on his bedroom and discover each other, they engage in a three-way catfight. Then an outraged husband (John T. Murray) shows up to shoot him. Dr. Dumont arrives and divulges Toto's condition. The husband and the three women all depart. Then Diane shows up, but before she leaves with her father for America, she insists on spending an hour of passion with him. Unable to resist, he kisses her. When he remains alive, he upbraids the newly arrived Dr. Dumont for his faulty prognosis. Mr. Churchill explains that he had Dumont fake his diagnosis, that it was all a test of Toto's claim he loved Diane "more than life itself". Convinced, he gives Toto permission to marry Diane.

Cast
Frank Fay as Toto Duryea
Laura LaPlante as Diane Churchill
Joan Blondell as Fifi
Charles Winninger as John Churchill
Alan Mowbray as Auguste, Toto's butler
Arthur Edmund Carewe as Dr. Louis Dumont
Billy House as Monsieur Cesare, a friend of Toto's
Yola d'Avril as Dagmar
Louise Brooks as Florine
Margaret Livingston as Tania Donaliff
Armand Kaliz as Monsieur Rancour
Charles Judels as Undertaker
Tyrell Davis as Basil (billed as Tyrrell Davis)
Eleanor Gutchrlein as Maybelle (as Sisters G)
Karla Gutchrlein as Marie (as Sisters G)

Cuts and surviving print
The following numbers were cut from the film version released in the United States, where musicals had temporarily lost their popularity:
 An elaborate dance number by the Sisters "G" (Eleanor and Karla Gutchrlein) originally appeared in the film during the nightclub sequence at the beginning of the film. Although the Sisters "G" appear in the credits, they are only seen for a couple of minutes in the shortened American version.
 Frank Fay sang the theme song, which is heard over the credits and is underscored several times in the film.

The complete film was released intact in countries outside the United States, but only the American print is known to have survived with a print preserved by the Library of Congress.

Warner Archive Collection released the film on DVD on December 11, 2012.

Box office
According to records at Warner Bros., the film earned $150,000 domestically and $18,000 foreign.

References

External links
 
 
 

1931 films
1931 musical comedy films
1931 romantic comedy films
American black-and-white films
American films based on plays
American musical comedy films
American romantic comedy films
1930s English-language films
Films directed by Michael Curtiz
Warner Bros. films
1930s American films